ASU Preparatory Academy, Phoenix High School is a University-preparatory school within the Arizona State University Preparatory Academy, located in Phoenix, Arizona, United States.

The ASU Preparatory Academy, Phoenix High School is part of a series of preparatory schools for Arizona State University, including ASU Preparatory Academy, Casa Grande, ASU Preparatory Academy, Polytechnic and ASU Prep Digital.

References 

High schools in Phoenix, Arizona
Arizona State University
Public high schools in Arizona
Charter schools in Arizona